Apollo and Marsyas is an oil on canvas painting by the Italian artist Luca Giordano, crated c. 1665. It is held at the collection of the Pushkin Museum, in Moscow. A variant of the work is in the Bardini Museum, in Florence.

Its early history is unknown. It was already in Nikolay Yusupov's collection by the start of the 19th century with its correct attribution, but was misattributed to Pierre Subleyras in an 1831 inventory of the Yusupov collection. In 1837 it was moved from Yusupov's Moscow palace to the Tiepolo gallery of the Arkhangelskoye Palace, before being sent to the Moika Palace in Saint Petersburg.

After the Russian Revolution all the Yusupov princes' goods were seized by the state and a museum was set up in the palace. In the 1924 inventory it was misattributed again, this time to José de Ribera, but later that year the Yusupov Museum was closed and it was transferred to its present home, where it resumed its correct attribution.

References

1665 paintings
Paintings by Luca Giordano
Paintings in the collection of the Pushkin Museum
Paintings in the collection of the Museo Bardini
Paintings of Apollo